The 2013 Japanese motorcycle Grand Prix was the seventeen round of the 2013 MotoGP season. It was held at the Twin Ring Motegi in Motegi on 27 October 2013. Jorge Lorenzo won the MotoGP race to gain Yamaha its 200th victory in the 500cc/MotoGP class. Pol Espargaró clinched the Moto2 world title after title contenders Scott Redding and Esteve Rabat crashed out in the race.

This was Valentino Rossi's 200th race in the 500cc/MotoGP class.

Classification

MotoGP

Moto2
The first attempt to run the race was interrupted on the opening lap, following an incident involving Scott Redding, Álex Mariñelarena and Esteve Rabat. For the restart, the race distance was reduced from 23 to 15 laps.

Moto3

Championship standings after the race (MotoGP)
Below are the standings for the top five riders and constructors after round seventeen has concluded.

Riders' Championship standings

Constructors' Championship standings

 Note: Only the top five positions are included for both sets of standings.

References

Japanese motorcycle Grand Prix
Japanese
Motorcycle Grand Prix
Japanese motorcycle Grand Prix